Born Again is the eleventh studio album by English rock band Black Sabbath. Released on 12 September 1983, it is the only album the group recorded with lead vocalist Ian Gillan, best known for his work with Deep Purple. It was also the last Black Sabbath album for nine years to feature original bassist Geezer Butler and the last to feature original drummer Bill Ward, though Ward did record a studio track with the band fifteen years later on their 1998 live album Reunion. The album has received mixed reviews from critics, but was a commercial success upon its 1983 release, reaching No. 4 in the UK charts. The album also hit the top 40 in the United States. In July 2021, guitarist and founding member Tony Iommi confirmed that the long lost original master tapes of the album had been finally located, and that he was considering remixing the album for a future re-release.

Origins
Following the departure of vocalist Ronnie James Dio and drummer Vinny Appice in 1982, Sabbath's future was in doubt. The band switched management to Don Arden (Sharon Osbourne's father) and he suggested Ian Gillan as the new vocalist. "That band was put together on paper," guitarist Tony Iommi revealed in the 1992 documentary Black Sabbath: 1978–1992. "We'd never rehearsed."

The band had considered vocalists such as Robert Plant and David Coverdale before settling on Gillan. They even received an audition tape from a then-unknown Michael Bolton. Iommi told Hit Parader magazine in late 1983 that Gillan was the best candidate, saying "His shriek is legendary." Gillan was at first reluctant, but his manager convinced him to meet with Iommi and Butler at The Bear, a pub in Oxford. After a night of heavy drinking, Gillan officially committed to the project in February 1983.

The project was originally intended to be a new supergroup, and the members of the group had no intention of billing themselves as Black Sabbath. At some point after recording had been completed, Arden insisted that they use the recognizable Sabbath name, and the members were overruled. "We thought we were doing a kind of Gillan-Iommi-Butler-Ward album…" recalled bassist Geezer Butler. "That is the way we approached the album. When we had finished the album, we took it to the record company and they said, 'Well, here's the contract: it is going to go out as a Black Sabbath album."

Born Again featured the return of founding member Bill Ward on drums, who was newly sober after leaving the band in 1980 to deal with his alcoholism. Ward began drinking again near the end of the sessions and returned to Los Angeles for treatment once the album was completed, and has remained sober ever since. Ward has said that he enjoyed making the album, which remains his final studio album with the band.

Recording
Sabbath began recording in May 1983 at Richard Branson's Manor Studio, in the Oxfordshire countryside. Producer Robin Black had worked with the band in the mid-1970s, as engineer on Sabotage.

In his autobiography, Iommi recounts Gillan informing him that, during sessions, he planned to live outside the house in a marquee tent: "I thought he was joking, but when I arrived at the Manor I saw this marquee outside and I thought, fucking hell, he's serious. Ian had put up this big, huge tent. It had a cooking area and a bedroom and whatever else."  Gillan brought an immediacy to the songwriting that was uncommon for Sabbath: "Ian's lyrics were about sexual things or true facts, even about stuff that happened at The Manor there and then," Iommi recalls in his memoir. "They were good, but quite a departure from Geezer's and Ronnie's lyrics." For example, Gillan returned from a local pub one evening, took a car belonging to drummer Ward, and commenced racing around a go-cart track on the Manor Studio property. He crashed the car, which burst into flames after he escaped uninjured. He wrote the album's opening "Trashed" about the experience.

"Disturbing the Priest" was written after a rehearsal space – set up by Iommi in a small building near a local church – received noise complaints from the resident priests. "We wanted this effect on 'Disturbing the Priest'," recalled the guitarist, "and Bill got this big bucket of water and he got this anvil. It was really heavy, and he'd got it hanging on a piece of rope and lower it in to get this effect: hit it and lower it in, and then lift it out again. It was a great effect, but it took hours to do."

"I did some of the best drum work on that album…" Bill Ward recalled. "On 'Disturbing the Priest', there were some polyrhythms and some counterpoint things that I was doing, and I was using at least twenty different pieces of percussion towards the end of that song… I was real proud of a lot of the work that I did. Some of it invariably got lost in the mix, but I know that it's printed on those tracks."

The band got along well, but it became apparent to all involved that Gillan's style did not quite mesh with the Sabbath sound. In 1992, he told director Martin Baker, "I was the worst singer Black Sabbath ever had. It was totally, totally incompatible with any music they'd ever done. I didn't wear leathers, I wasn't of that image...I think the fans probably were in a total state of confusion." In 1992, Iommi admitted to Guitar World, "Ian is a great singer, but he's from a completely different background, and it was difficult for him to come in and sing Sabbath material."

"I saw Ian go into the studio one day," Ward recalled, "and I was fortunate and honoured, actually, to be part of a session. I watched him lay tracks on 'Keep It Warm'… I felt like Ian was Ian in that song… I watched this incredible transformation of this man that really, I felt, delicately put lyrics together. It made sense. I thought he did an excellent job. And I really dig that song too."

When the band heard the final product, they were horrified at the muffled mix. In his autobiography, Iommi explains that Gillan inadvertently blew a couple of tweeters in the studio speakers by playing the backing tracks too loud and nobody noticed.  "We just thought it was a bit of a funny sound, but it went very wrong somewhere between the mix and the mastering and the pressing of that album...the sound was really dull and muffly.  I didn't know about it, because we were already out on tour in Europe.  By the time we heard the album, it was out and in the charts, but the sound was awful."

For all his misgivings, Gillan remembers the period fondly, stating in the Black Sabbath: 1978–1992 documentary, "But by God, we had a good year...And the songs, I think, were quite good."

Breakup
Drummer Bev Bevan was brought in to play drums for the subsequent tour, as Bill Ward had entered a rehab facility. Following the tour, this version of Black Sabbath fell apart, with Gillan, Bevan, and Ward departing. The tour was also a breaking point for Butler, who admits in the Black Sabbath: 1978–1992 documentary, "I just got totally disillusioned with the whole thing and I left some time in 1984 after the Born Again tour. I just had enough of it." In 2015 Butler clarified to Dave Everley of Classic Rock: "I left because my second child was born and he was having problems, so I wanted to stay with him. I told Tony I couldn't concentrate on the band anymore. But I never fell out with anybody." Butler says the looming Deep Purple reunion played a large role in Gillan's decision to leave. Disagreements with management also contributed to the band's dissolution. Bevan would briefly return to the Sabbath fold in 1986-87 to record cymbal overdubs for the album The Eternal Idol.

Album cover
The cover – depicting what Martin Popoff described as a "garish red devil-baby" – is by Steve 'Krusher' Joule, a Kerrang! designer who also worked on Ozzy Osbourne's Speak of the Devil. It is based on a black-and-white photocopy of a photograph published in a 1968 magazine. The same photograph was used for 12-inch versions of Depeche Mode's "New Life".

"I didn't have any participation in the album cover," recalled Bill Ward. "When I saw it, I hated it."

Ian Gillan told the press that he vomited when he first saw the picture. However, Tony Iommi approved the cover, which has been considered one of the worst ever. Ben Mitchell of Blender called the cover "awful". The British magazine, Kerrang!, ranked the cover in second place, behind only the Scorpions' Lovedrive, on their list of "10 Worst Album Sleeves in Metal/Hard Rock". The list was based on votes from the magazine's readers. NME included the sleeve on their list of the "29 sickest album covers ever". Sabbath's manager Don Arden was quite hostile towards the band's ex-vocalist Ozzy Osbourne, who had recently married his manager Sharon, and was fond of telling Osbourne that his children resembled the Born Again cover.

Release and reception

Born Again was released on 12 September 1983 and was a commercial success. It was the highest charting Black Sabbath album in the United Kingdom since Sabbath Bloody Sabbath (1973), and became an American Top 40 hit. Despite this, it was the first Black Sabbath album to fall short of RIAA certification.

The album received mixed reviews upon its release. AllMusic's Eduardo Rivadavia wrote that the album has "gone down as one of heavy metal's all-time greatest disappointments" and described "Zero the Hero", "Hot Line", and "Keep It Warm" as "embarrassing". Blender contributor Ben Mitchell gave the album one out of five stars and claimed that the music on Born Again was worse than its cover. Martin Charles Strong, the author of The Essential Rock Discography, wrote that it was "an exercise in heavy-metal cliché". However, Popmatters contributor Adrien Begrand has noted the album as "overlooked". The British magazine Metal Forces defined it "a very good album" even if "Gillan may not be the perfect frontman for the Sabs".

Despite the overall negative reception with critics, the album remains a fan favorite. Author Martin Popoff has written that "if any album in the history of Black Sabbath is getting a new set of horns up from metalheads here deep into the new century, it's Born Again." Industrial metal band Godflesh and death metal band Cannibal Corpse both have covered "Zero the Hero", the former appears on the Masters Of Misery - Black Sabbath: The Earache Tribute album while the latter is featured on the Hammer Smashed Face EP. Cannibal Corpse's former singer, Chris Barnes, has called Born Again his favourite Black Sabbath album. "Zero the Hero" has also been cited as the inspiration for the Guns N' Roses hit "Paradise City", and in his autobiography Iommi also suggests the Beastie Boys may have borrowed the riff from "Hot Line" for their hit "(You Gotta) Fight For Your Right (To Party!)".  Metallica drummer Lars Ulrich has called Born Again "one of the best Black Sabbath albums". Bill Stevenson, former drummer of Black Flag, stated the band was listening to the album around the time of My War, defining songs like "Trashed" and "Disturbing the Priest" as "ideal".

In 1984, Ozzy Osbourne stated that the album was the "best thing I've heard from Sabbath since the original group broke up". Butler has pointed to "Zero the Hero" and "Disturbing the Priest" as his favorites on the album. In 1992, Iommi confessed to Guitar World, "To be honest, I didn't like some of the songs on that album, and the production was awful. We never had time to test the pressings after it was recorded, and something happened to it by the time it got released."

Ian Gillan expressed disappointment in the final production mix of the album, saying that although he did not break his first copy of it, "I threw it out the window of my car. [Laughs]" He also reflected on the touring activity with the band, "I was with Black Sabbath for a year and I sang Ozzy Osbourne songs as well as the songs from Born Again. And I never felt right doing that. It was great — I could sing them okay — but I didn't sound like Ozzy. There was something not quite right."

A re-mastered 'Deluxe Expanded Edition' of Born Again was released in May 2011 by Sanctuary Records. It included several live tracks from the 1983 Reading Festival originally featured on BBC Radio 1's Friday Rock Show. Though the release was remastered, it was not remixed due to the inability to locate the original master tapes, as well as Sanctuary not wanting delay the release in an effort to locate said tapes for a remix.

In 2021, Tony Iommi claimed that the original master tapes, long thought lost, had been found and that he was considering remixing them for an eventual release.

Born Again Tour and Stonehenge props

According to Iommi's autobiography, Ward began drinking again near the end of the Born Again recording sessions and returned to Los Angeles for treatment.  The band recruited Bev Bevan, who had played with The Move and ELO, for the upcoming tour in support of the new album.  Gillan had all the lyrics to the Sabbath songs written out and plastered all over the stage, explaining to Martin Baker in 1992, "I couldn't get into my brain any of these lyrics...I cannot soak in these words.  There's no storyline. I can't relate to what they mean."  Gillan attempted to overcome the problem by having a cue book with plastic pages on stage, which he would turn with his foot during the show.  However, Gillan did not anticipate the "six buckets" of dry ice that engulfed the stage, making it impossible for the singer to see the lyric sheets.  "Ian wasn't very sure-footed either," Iommi writes in his memoir.  "He once fell over my pedal board.  He was waving at the people, stepped back and, bang!, he went arse over head big time."  Gillan also told Birch that it was Don Arden's idea to open the show with a crying baby blaring over the speakers and a dwarf made to look exactly like the demonic baby depicted on the Born Again album cover miming to the screaming.  "We noticed a dwarf walking around the day before the opening show...And we're saying to Don, 'We think this is in the worst possible taste, this dwarf, you know?'  And Don's going, 'Nah, the kids will love it, it'll be great.'"

The tour is most infamous, however, for the gigantic Stonehenge props the band used.  Iommi recalls in his autobiography that it was Butler's idea but the designers took his measurements the wrong way and thought it was meant to be life-size.  Months later, while rehearsing for the tour at the Birmingham NEC, the stage set arrived.  "We were in shock," writes Iommi.  "This stuff was coming in and in and in.  It had all these huge columns in the back that were as wide as your average bedroom, the columns in front were about 13 feet high, and we had all the monitors and the side fills as well as all this rock.  It was made of fiberglass and wood, and bloody heavy." The set would be lampooned in Rob Reiner's 1984 rock music mockumentary This Is Spinal Tap, with the band having the opposite problem of having to use miniature Stonehenge stage props.  Butler has said that he told the associate scriptwriter of the film the story of the band's performances with their "Stonehenge" stage props. In an interview for the documentary Black Sabbath: 1978–1992, Gillan claims Don Arden had the dwarf walk across the top of the Stonehenge props at the start of the show and, as the tape of the screaming baby faded away, fall back "from about thirty-five feet in the air on this big pile of mattresses.  And then, 'Dong!' The bells start and the monks come out, the whole thing.  Pure Spinal Tap."  The band toured Europe first, playing the Reading Festival (a performance that is included on the 2011 deluxe edition of Born Again) and also playing in a bullring in Barcelona in September.  Sabbath performed Gillan's hit with Deep Purple, "Smoke on the Water", on the tour, with Iommi explaining in his memoir, "it seemed like a bum deal for him not to do any of his stuff while he was doing all of ours.  I don't know if we played it properly but the audience loved it.  The critics moaned; it was something out of the bag and they didn't want to know then."  In October, the band took the Stonehenge set to America but could only use a portion of it at most gigs because the columns were too high. The set was eventually abandoned.  A music video for "Zero the Hero" was also released, featuring performance footage of the band onstage interspersed with scenes involving several grotesque characters performing experiments on a witless young man in a haunted house filled with rats, roosters and a roaming horse.

Track listing

Standard edition
All songs credited to Tony Iommi, Geezer Butler, Bill Ward, and Ian Gillan, except where noted.

2011 deluxe edition disc 2
Tracks 3-11 recorded live at the Reading Festival on Saturday, August 27, 1983 and first aired on Friday Rock Show via BBC Radio 1.

Personnel 
Black Sabbath
Ian Gillan – vocals
Tony Iommi – guitars, guitar effects, flute
Geezer Butler – bass, bass effects
Bill Ward – drums, percussion

Additional musicians
Geoff Nicholls – keyboards
Bev Bevan – drums (on 2011 Deluxe Edition – Disc 2, tracks 3–11)

Credits
Steve Barrett – art assistant
Black Sabbath – producer
Robin Black – producer, engineer
Stephen Chase – engineer, assistant engineer
Paul Clark – co-ordination
Hugh Gilmour – liner notes, design, reissue design, original sleeve design
Ross Halfin – photography
Steve Joule – artwork, cover design
Peter Restey – equipment technician
Ray Staff – remastering
Chris Walter – photography

Release history

Charts

See also
Born Again Tour 1983

References

External links
 

1983 albums
Black Sabbath albums
Vertigo Records albums
Warner Records albums